Statistics of Soviet Top League for the 1976 season.

Spring

Overview
It was contested by 16 teams, and Dynamo Moscow won the championship.

League standings

Results

Top scorers
8 goals
 Arkady Andreasyan (Ararat)

7 goals
 Nikolai Kazaryan (Ararat)

6 goals
 Ravil Aryapov (Krylya Sovetov)
 Vladimir Danilyuk (Karpaty)
 David Kipiani (Dinamo Tbilisi)
 Boris Kopeikin (CSKA Moscow)
 Anatoliy Shepel (Dynamo Moscow)

5 goals
 Lev Brovarsky (Karpaty)
 Anatoli Degterev (Torpedo Moscow)
 Sergei Grishin (Torpedo Moscow)
 Sergei Malko (Dnipro)
 Aleksandr Markin (Zenit)
 Yuri Smirnov (Krylya Sovetov)
 Pyotr Vasilevsky (Dinamo Minsk)

Autumn

Overview
It was performed in 16 teams, and Torpedo Moscow won the championship.

League standings

Results

Top scorers
13 goals
 Aleksandr Markin (Zenit)

8 goals
 Vladimir Danilyuk (Karpaty)
 Boris Kopeikin (CSKA Moscow)

6 goals
 Mikhail Bulgakov (Spartak Moscow)

5 goals
 Oleg Blokhin (Dynamo Kyiv)
 Fyodor Chorba (Karpaty)
 Yevgeni Khrabrostin (Torpedo Moscow)
 Nazar Petrosyan (Ararat)
 Aleksandr Pogorelov (Chornomorets)
 Vladimir Sakharov (Torpedo Moscow)
 Pyotr Yakovlev (Dnipro)
 Andrei Yakubik (Dynamo Moscow)

References
Soviet Union - List of final tables (RSSSF)

1969
1
Soviet
Soviet